Spring Hill Review was an alternative tabloid-style newspaper published monthly in Brush Prairie, Washington, distributed in Oregon and Washington states, and mailed to subscribers throughout the United States. Sub-titled  A Journal of Northwest Culture, it was founded by Carolyn Schultz-Rathbun and Lucy S. R. Austen in 2000 and published essays, articles, book and music reviews, short fiction, poetry, visual art, interviews, and cartoons. It had a circulation of 6,100 when it ceased publication in 2006.

Spring Hill Review was described in the 2006 edition of Writer's Market as "a journal of contemporary Northwest US culture commenting on and challenging Northwest politics, arts, and current social and spiritual issues."

References

Clark County, Washington
Newspapers published in Washington (state)